The Movement for an Equal Public Model (Dviženie za ravnopraven obshestven model DROM) is a political party in Bulgaria. It was part of the United Democratic Forces when it ran in its first legislative elections on 25 June 2005. The electoral alliance won 8.4% of the popular vote and 20 out of 240 seats.

Political parties in Bulgaria
Romani political parties